André Lancelot (21 July 1900 – 7 February 1992) was a French rower. He competed in the men's eight event at the 1924 Summer Olympics.

References

External links
 

1900 births
1992 deaths
French male rowers
Olympic rowers of France
Rowers at the 1924 Summer Olympics